Brazil sent a delegation to compete at the 1976 Summer Paralympics in Toronto, Ontario, Canada. Its athletes finished thirty-second in the overall medal count.

See also 
 1976 Summer Paralympics
 Brazil at the 1976 Summer Olympics

References 

Nations at the 1976 Summer Paralympics
1976
Summer Paralympics